The Australia national football team represents the country of Australia in international association football. It is fielded by Football Federation Australia, the governing body of soccer in Australia, and competes as a member of the Asian Football Confederation (AFC), which encompasses the countries of Asia.

Australia have competed in numerous competitions, and all players who have played in only one match, either as a member of the starting eleven or as a substitute, are listed below. Each player's details include his usual playing position while with the team, the number of caps earned and goals scored in all international matches, and details of the first and most recent matches played in. The names are initially ordered by date of debut, and then by alphabetical order. All statistics are correct up to and including the match played on 7 October 2021.

Key

Players

See also
 List of Australia international soccer players, covering players with ten or more caps
 List of Australia international soccer players (4–9 caps)
 List of Australia international soccer players (2–3 caps)

References
General
 

Specific

Lists of Australia international soccer players
Association football player non-biographical articles